Long Eaton motorcycle speedway teams operated from 1950 until 1997 in Long Eaton, England. Teams have raced at the Long Eaton Stadium as the Long Eaton Archers, Long Eaton Rangers, Nottingham Outlaws and the Long Eaton Invaders. The Invaders returned in 2011, with home meetings taking place at the Leicester Lions' track.

History
Speedway events had been hosted at Long Eaton from as early as 1929, the first meeting being on 18 May 1929. The team were founder members of the 1929 Speedway English Dirt Track League but withdrew and had their results expunged. The Derby Evening Telegraph described the oval circuit as having four laps to the mile, with straights  and the bends  'to allow broadsiding at 60 mph'. The last meeting of this era was on 10 June 1930.

Speedway events returned to Long Eaton in 1950 with a team initially called the "Archers". The team operated until 1953 when the promotion closed. The "Archers" name was again used when the track re-opened in 1963 until it closed again at the end of the 1967 season. In 1969 the track re-opened with the team named "Rangers" until 1974 when the "Archers" name was used for one more season. The track opened again in 1979 and were called the "Nottingham Outlaws" but closed at the end of the 1980 season.

Another revival followed in 1982 as the team was again re-branded, but this time as the "Long Eaton Invaders" – the name was chosen due to the popularity of the Space Invaders arcade game at that time. The Invaders won the National League Championship in 1984 and the Premier League Four-Team Championship in 1997. In early 1998 it was announced that the stadium was to be sold for housing development and the club would have to vacate immediately. The proposed development never took place, and there was an unsuccessful attempt to reopen the site for speedway racing in 2005.

The site was later approved for a residential development with public open spaces by Erewash Borough Council, and is now a housing estate.

The Long Eaton Invaders returned in 2011, competing in the amateur status Midland League, sharing the Leicester Lions' new track in Beaumont Park Stadium for home matches. They ended the 2011 season as Midland League champions. They continued to compete in the junior leagues until 2016.

Season summary

References

External links
Long Eaton Invaders official website
Close up Satellite image of derelict stadium 

Speedway
Sport in Derbyshire
British speedway teams